is an aerospace museum in the city of Misawa, Aomori Prefecture, Japan. The museum was opened on August 8, 2003, and is located adjacent to Misawa Airport.

Museum building
The highlight of the display on the ground floor of the museum is a  NAMC YS-11 formerly operated by Japan Air Commuter.

Other displays concentrate on the history of aviation, including a full-scale model of the Wright Flyer and of the Miss Veedol, the first aircraft to make a successful nonstop transpacific flight, which originated from Misawa's Sabishiro Beach in 1931.  Other full-scale models include that of a Mitsubishi A6M Zero, Tachikawa Ki-54 and the Gasuden Koken, as well as a McDonnell Douglas DC-9 cockpit.

The second floor of the museum has flight simulators and displays on aerospace engineering and the third floor is an observation deck with a view of the runways of Misawa Air Base.

Aircraft on display
NAMC YS-11A-227, registration JA8776
Westland WS-51 Dragonfly, registration JA7014
General Dynamics F-16A, serial 78-0021
McDonnell Douglas F-4EJ-kai, serial 57-8375
Fuji T-3, serial 91-5516
Lockheed T-33, serial 81-5344
Lockheed F-104J  serial 76-8699
Lockheed UP-3A, serial 150526
Mitsubishi F-1, serial 00-8247
Mitsubishi T-2 (in Blue Impulse livery), serial 59-5108
Mitsubishi T-2, serial 29-5177
Mitsubishi LR-1, serial 2209
Kawasaki/Hughes OH-6D, serial 30270
Pitts Special S-1C, registration N122EZ

References

External links

Aomori Sightseeing Guide

Museums in Aomori Prefecture
Aerospace museums in Japan
Prefectural museums
Science museums in Japan
Museums established in 2002
2002 establishments in Japan
Misawa, Aomori